Sørfinnset is a village in the municipality of Gildeskål in Nordland county, Norway. It is located on the mainland, south of the village of Inndyr and east of the village of Storvika. Sørfjorden Chapel is located in the village.

References

Gildeskål
Villages in Nordland